Saffet Kaya (born 14 August 1981) is a Turkish footballer. He made his Süper Lig debut on 18 August 2001. Kaya is an uncle of Kaan Ayhan.

References

External links
 
 

1981 births
Living people
People from Recklinghausen
Sportspeople from Münster (region)
Turkish footballers
Galatasaray S.K. footballers
Antalyaspor footballers
Süper Lig players
Association football forwards
Footballers from North Rhine-Westphalia